Qeedi Haan is a town in the Togdheer region of Somaliland.

References

Qeedi Haan

Populated places in Togdheer